Madness Live: To the Edge of the Universe and Beyond is a double live album by British ska band Madness. It was released in November 2006 as in-lays in two consecutive issues of the newspaper The Mail on Sunday.

Content
Although Madness Live: To The Edge Of The Universe And Beyond is named after the group's 2005-6 tour of the same name, many of the recordings are in fact older and some had been issued before ("Razor Blade Alley" and "The Sun and the Rain" in particular contain distinctive ad libs which make them easily recognisable as coming from the band's previous live LP, Madstock!). Two tracks, "Prospects" and "March of the Gherkins", appear in mono.

Track listing
Part 1
"The Prince"
"My Girl"
"Embarrassment"
"House Of Fun"
"The Sun and the Rain" (from Madstock!)
"Bed & Breakfast Man" 
"Razor Blade Alley" (from Madstock!)
"Prospects"
"Grey Day"
"It Must Be Love"

Part 2
"Baggy Trousers"
"Our House"
"Shut Up"
"Lovestruck"
"Close Escape"
"Wings of a Dove"
"Driving in My Car"
"March of the Gherkins"
"In the City"
"Night Boat to Cairo"

References

External links

2006 live albums
Madness (band) live albums